The 2016 Conservative Party leadership election was held due to Prime Minister David Cameron's resignation as party leader. He had resigned after losing the national referendum to leave the European Union. Cameron, who supported Britain's continued membership of the EU, announced his resignation on 24 June, saying that he would step down by October. Theresa May won the contest on 11 July 2016, after the withdrawal of Andrea Leadsom left her as the sole candidate.

Conservative members of Parliament had voted initially in a series of ballots to determine which two candidates would go forward to a nationwide ballot of Conservative Party members for the final decision. Five Conservative MPs put themselves forward as candidates: Justice Secretary Michael Gove, Work and Pensions Secretary Stephen Crabb, former Defence Secretary Liam Fox, Minister of State for Energy and Climate Change Andrea Leadsom, and Home Secretary Theresa May. Former Mayor of London Boris Johnson, seen as the front runner by political analysts, surprised many commentators by choosing not to run after Gove withdrew his backing and announced his own candidacy.

In the first-round ballot, May, gaining the support of half of Conservative MPs, was placed first with Leadsom in second place. Fox was eliminated on the first ballot; Crabb withdrew later that day. Gove was eliminated in the second round of voting. Before the Conservative Party members were due to cast their votes, Leadsom withdrew from the contest on 11 July. May was appointed party leader later that day, and prime minister on 13 July. She appointed Boris Johnson, Fox and Leadsom to her Cabinet, respectively as Foreign Secretary, international trade secretary, and environment secretary.

If not for Leadsom's withdrawal, Conservative Party members would have directly elected a new prime minister for the first time.

Background

During the 2015 general election campaign, David Cameron, then leader of the Conservative Party and prime minister, announced that he would not seek a third term; he was therefore expected to stand down before the following general election — at that time, expected to occur in 2020 — although he spoke of serving a full term.

Following a manifesto commitment, Cameron and the Conservative Party introduced legislation for a referendum on the UK's membership of the European Union, which was held on 23 June 2016. Cameron and the Government supported a Remain vote, although the Conservative Party was officially neutral in the campaign and many Conservative politicians, including some Cabinet members, campaigned to Leave. There was speculation during the campaign as to whether Cameron would resign if Leave won, but on the day of the referendum, both Leave- and Remain-supporting Conservatives called for him to stay whatever the result.

A Leave win was announced on the morning of 24 June 2016, and Cameron announced shortly afterward that he would be stepping down. He said that he would continue in post while the leadership election was ongoing, with the new leader to be in place in time for the party conference in October. However, the way in which events unfolded resulted in his much earlier departure.

The campaign was framed by whether candidates had supported Remain or Leave; initial speculation by some analysts was that a Leave supporter would be more likely to win. Based on media speculation, the front runners on 29 June were Boris Johnson (Leave) and Theresa May (Remain), with Johnson the early favourite. Johnson's candidacy was expected to be supported by Michael Gove, the two having worked together for Leave through the referendum campaign, as well as by Andrea Leadsom. However, earlier that week, May was leading by a narrow margin in opinion polls commissioned by The Times and by The Independent.

Gove, previously seen as a key ally of the Johnson campaign, announced his own candidacy three hours before nominations closed, stating that he had reluctantly come to the conclusion that Johnson could not "provide the leadership or build the team for the task ahead." Johnson subsequently withdrew from the leadership race. The Telegraph stated that Gove's actions in undermining Johnson's leadership aspirations constituted "the most spectacular political assassination in a generation." Gove's move was compared to the betrayals of fiction with, for example, Johnson's father, Stanley Johnson, quoting "Et tu Brute". Some of Johnson's allies subsequently began shifting their support to May, because they perceived a "systematic and calculated plot" by Gove to remove their candidate from the race.

By 5 July 2016, Gove was in a distant third place in the leadership race based on the number of endorsements received from other MPs. He was eliminated in the second MPs' ballot.

A post-contest analysis in The Daily Telegraph noted that the £275,000 contributions to Theresa May's campaign "dwarfed her rivals", and Cameron's original honours list contained the names of two major Conservative party donors who supported her campaign.

Campaign and key issues
The initial days of the campaign remained overshadowed by the fallout from Gove's entry into the race and Johnson's departure. May gathered the most support from MPs early on. Gavin Williamson — later to be appointed Chief Whip by May — was her parliamentary campaign manager and responsible for rallying this support, together with a small group of MPs including Julian Smith, Kris Hopkins, Simon Kirby, Karen Bradley and George Hollingbery. In the initial days of the campaign, Leadsom said that she would not rule out involving Nigel Farage, then the leader of the UK Independence Party (UKIP), in Brexit negotiations; the May campaign criticised Leadsom for claimed UKIP links. Leadsom had approached the Johnson campaign with a proposed deal not to run in exchange for being made one of his top three ministers. Johnson agreed to the deal, but was too late in communicating the decision, and Leadsom chose to run for leader.

All five candidates for the Conservative leadership said that they would not call an early general election, relying instead on the Conservative mandate secured at the 2015 election. The five candidates also rejected the idea of calling a second referendum on British withdrawal from the EU, pledging to take the UK out of the Union, although on different timeframes.

Among the key issues that emerged during the Conservative leadership campaign were:

The status of EU citizens living in the UK. The government stated following the EU referendum that the long-term status of EU nationals living in the UK and UK nationals living elsewhere in the EU would be a question for the next government, with the current government saying only that there would be "no immediate change" to EU nationals' status. May suggested that the status of EU citizens living in the UK could be part of exit negotiations; the other four Conservative leadership candidates opposed this notion, saying that EU nationals living in the UK should not be "negotiating chips" and pledging to allow EU nationals to remain in the country if chosen as prime minister.
When to trigger Article 50 of the Treaty on European Union, formally beginning the process of withdrawal from the European Union by the UK. May and Gove both stated that they would not invoke Article 50 before 2017. Leadsom called for a quick invocation of Article 50 and short negotiations, although she did not put forward a specific timeframe. Fox put forward a specific date, saying: "I would like to see us leaving the EU on January 1, 2019. That means we will have to activate the Article 50 process by the end of this year."
 What level of access to the European single market Britain should seek, and the future of migration policy and the free movement of EU nationals in the UK. Fox, the most right-wing of the five candidates, said that he only supported membership in the single market if the UK was allowed to completely opt-out of the free movement of people, which is viewed as extremely unlikely. Gove and Leadsom took a tough line of free movement, with Gove pledging to "end free movement [and] introduce an Australian-style points-based system for immigration" and Leadsom pledging that free movement "will end" without mentioning the single market. Crabb took what The Week described as "the most pro-single market stance" of the candidates, saying it was "vital" for the UK to have "as close an economic relationship with the EU as we have now" while also speaking of "controlling" immigration, signalling some willingness to compromise with the EU. May stated that it was her "priority to allow British companies to trade with the single market in goods and services" but said that she would not accept a deal "that involves accepting the free movement of people as it has worked hitherto"—also signalling willingness to some future compromise deal with the EU. Fox also pledged to reduce net migration to the tens of thousands, while Leadsom, Crabb and Gove did not specifically pledged to do so; May has said: "I think net migration in the tens of thousands is sustainable, but it is going to take time."
 Whether to approve the construction of a third runway at Heathrow Airport, a decision which was delayed to at least October 2016 in the wake of the Brexit referendum vote and the Conservative leadership campaign. Boris Johnson, who opted not to run, was a staunch opponent of the proposal; May and Gove, whose constituencies are near Heathrow, have dealt with noise complaints in the past but did not publicly take a stand on a third runway during the leadership campaign. Crabb, by contrast, said during the campaign that he was "a strong supporter of a third runway" at the airport to boost the economy.

An editorial in The Guardian noted that the Brexit-dominated leadership campaign presented a danger that the next prime minister would be chosen on this basis at a time when several major domestic issues would also demand the prime minister's attention, such as the disputes between the government and unions representing teachers and junior doctors.

An interview with Leadsom in The Times in early July created some controversy. The article quoted Leadsom as saying that motherhood gave her a better political perspective than May — who is childless — although Leadsom protested the article misrepresented her views. She later apologised to May. There was also controversy about claimed inaccuracies in Leadsom's CV. Meanwhile, Crabb, after his candidacy had ended, was reported to have been sexting a woman despite being married and stressing family values in his campaign.

Leadsom withdrew from the contest on 11 July, arguing that May should become leader promptly.

Election procedure
The election process for selecting the leader of the Conservative Party is overseen by the Conservative 1922 Committee, although election procedures are approved by the Board of the Conservative Party. Nominations for the leadership are invited by the Chairman of the 1922 Committee (Graham Brady at the time), acting as Returning Officer for all stages of the election. Candidates must be proposed and seconded in writing, with names of the proposers and seconders being published. When nominations close, a list of valid nominations is published. If there is only one valid nomination, that person is declared elected. If only two valid nominations are received, both names go forward to the general membership of the Party. If more than two nominations are received, a ballot is held within the Parliamentary Party on the Tuesday immediately following the closing date for nominations. An exhaustive ballot system is used to select two candidates to go forward to the general membership of the Party.

A ballot paper is produced and issued to all Conservative Members in the House of Commons, who indicate one choice from the candidates listed. Proxy votes are possible. The ballot is conducted in secret. If there are three candidates in the first ballot, the two who receive the most votes go forward to the general membership. If there are more than three, the candidate receiving the fewest votes is eliminated and a second ballot, under the same rules, is held the following Thursday. If there are no more than three candidates in the second ballot, the two receiving the most votes go forward to the general membership. If a third ballot is required, it is held the following Tuesday. This process is repeated as often as necessary, on alternate Tuesdays and Thursdays. When a ballot with only three candidates is reached, the two candidates who receive the highest number of votes go forward to the general membership. Candidates may withdraw their names at any time, "up to 24 hours of the opening of the ballot", but no new nominations will be accepted after the first ballot.

The two candidates selected by the Parliamentary Party are then put to the full membership of the Party (specifically, "all the members of the Conservative Party in good standing who have been members for not less than three months prior to the date of the announcement of the Vote of Confidence") in a postal ballot. Each Party member, on a "one member, one vote" basis, may vote for their preferred candidate. It is not explicitly stated in the rules from when the three months applies, in the eventuality of the leader resigning, but Rule 5 in the "Rules for the Election of the Leader" (which appears as Schedule 2 to the Constitution of the Conservative Party) gives this as "immediately prior to the close of the ballot for the election of the Leader". The Chairman of the 1922 Committee consults with the Board of the Conservative Party to agree the closing date for the ballot, which will be "as soon as practicable" after the date of the last ballot in the Parliamentary Party. The chairman, as returning officer, shall agree with the Board who is responsible, under his direction, for the receipt and counting of the votes, and the chairman announces the results "as soon as practicable" to a meeting of the Parliamentary Party and representatives of the Conservative Party.

Should only a single candidate be nominated, or all but one candidate be eliminated or withdraw before the scheduled end of the election (set in this instance as 9 September 2016), that single (or remaining) candidate is elected effectively unopposed without—if applicable—the votes of the party membership being issued (or counted if the ballot papers have already been issued).

Results
The first ballot of MPs was held on 5 July. The results were announced at 18:30 by 1922 Committee chairman Graham Brady. May placed first, far ahead of her closest rival Leadsom. Fifth-placed candidate Fox was knocked out of the race, and Crabb withdrew following scandalous revelations about his private life; both endorsed May. Gove, Leadsom and May went through to the second ballot held on 7 July. May again was the clear winner, with Leadsom beating Gove, which meant that May and Leadsom went through to the members' ballot, the result of which was due to be announced on 9 September.

However, on 11 July, Leadsom withdrew from the race, saying it is in the "best interests of the country", leaving May as the only candidate. Conservative MP and Chairman of the 1922 Committee, Graham Brady, announced that May would be confirmed as Conservative Party leader as soon as the party's board had been consulted. She was confirmed as leader; David Cameron tendered his resignation as Prime Minister on 13 July, with May accepting the Queen's invitation to succeed him shortly afterwards. Having been appointed Prime Minister, she entered 10 Downing Street with a speech emphasising the term Unionist in the name of the party, reminding all of "the precious, precious bond between England, Scotland, Wales and Northern Ireland."

After she became Prime Minister, May's cabinet appointments tilted to the right, according to The Guardian; but her speech clearly targeted the left, with a promise to combat the "burning injustice" in British society and create a union "between all of our citizens" and promising to be an advocate for the "ordinary working-class family" and not for the affluent in the UK. "The government I lead will be driven not by the interests of the privileged few but by yours. We will do everything we can to give you more control over your lives. ... When we take the big calls, we'll think not of the powerful, but you. When we pass new laws we'll listen not to the mighty, but to you. When it comes to taxes we'll prioritise not the wealthy but you."

:

Academic analysis 
Analysis of the results of the second ballot by Jeffery et al., published in the journal Parliamentary Affairs, have shown that Conservative MPs could be split into three electoral groups: Remain-backing Conservative MPs were more likely to support May, while Leave-backing MPs were split between socially-liberal Leave MPs, who were more likely to back Gove, and socially-conservative Leave MPs, who showed a greater propensity to vote for Leadsom.

Timeline
24 June 2016 – Following the result of the referendum on the United Kingdom's membership of the European Union, Prime Minister David Cameron announces his resignation as Leader of the Conservative Party.
27 June 2016 – The 1922 Committee announce the arrangements for the leadership contest.
28 June 2016 – Chancellor of the Exchequer George Osborne announces he will not run for leader; Health Secretary Jeremy Hunt tells Good Morning Britain that he is "seriously considering" putting himself forward as a candidate.
28 June 2016 – Stephen Crabb becomes the first Conservative MP to formally announce his candidacy for the leadership. He runs on a ticket with Business Secretary Sajid Javid as his pick for Chancellor of the Exchequer.
29 June 2016 – Leadership nominations by the Parliamentary Party open at 18:00 BST.
30 June 2016 – Michael Gove announces his bid to become party leader.
30 June 2016 – Boris Johnson, the former Mayor of London and the bookies' favourite, announces that he will not enter the leadership contest.
30 June 2016 – Theresa May, Andrea Leadsom and Liam Fox also announce their leadership campaigns.
30 June 2016 – Nominations close at noon.
3 July 2016 – Foreign Secretary Philip Hammond endorses Theresa May, commending her "old-fashioned British pragmatism."
4 July 2016 – Boris Johnson endorses Andrea Leadsom, saying she has "the zap, the drive, and the determination" to unite the party.
5 July 2016 – Liam Fox is eliminated in the first ballot held by the Parliamentary Party and endorses Theresa May; Stephen Crabb withdraws from the race and endorses Theresa May. 
7 July 2016 – Michael Gove is eliminated in the second ballot held by the Parliamentary Party; Theresa May and Andrea Leadsom proceed to the party membership ballot.
9 July 2016 – The Times reports that Leadsom had told one of its reporters that she would be better placed to lead the country because she has children, whereas May does not.
11 July 2016 – Leadsom withdraws from the leadership race and May becomes Leader of the Conservative Party.
12 July 2016 – David Cameron chairs his final Cabinet meeting as May plans her cabinet.
13 July 2016 – Following his last Prime Minister's Questions, Cameron offers his resignation to the Queen at Buckingham Palace and recommends that she invite May to form a government. The Queen accepts Cameron's resignation, and invites May to form a government.
13 July 2016 – Prime Minister Theresa May appoints Boris Johnson, who declined to run for the premiership, the new Foreign Secretary.

Candidates

Explored
The following individuals announced that they would seek the leadership of the Conservative Party but then eventually did not stand, or withdrew from the race, due to insufficient support or other reasons: 
John Baron, MP for Basildon and Billericay since 2001 (Leave supporter) (endorsed Andrea Leadsom)
Jeremy Hunt, Secretary of State for Health since 2012; MP for South West Surrey since 2005 (Remain supporter) (endorsed Theresa May)
Boris Johnson, former Mayor of London; MP for Uxbridge and South Ruislip since 2015 (Leave supporter) (endorsed Andrea Leadsom)
Nicky Morgan, Secretary of State for Education since 2014; MP for Loughborough since 2010 (Remain supporter) (endorsed Boris Johnson, later Michael Gove, later Theresa May)

Declined
The following individuals were the focus of media speculation as being possible leadership candidates, but ruled out a bid or did not stand by the requisite time:
Graham Brady, Chairman of the 1922 Committee since 2010; MP for Altrincham and Sale West since 1997 (Leave supporter)
Robert Buckland, Solicitor General for England and Wales since 2014; MP for Swindon South since 2010 (Remain supporter) (endorsed Theresa May)
George Freeman, Parliamentary Undersecretary of State for Life Sciences since 2014; MP for Mid Norfolk since 2010 (Remain supporter) (endorsed Theresa May)
Chris Grayling, Leader of the House of Commons since 2015; MP for Epsom and Ewell since 2001 (Leave supporter) (endorsed Theresa May–Campaign Chair)
Justine Greening, Secretary of State for International Development since 2012; MP for Putney since 2005  (Remain supporter) (endorsed Theresa May)
Sajid Javid, Secretary of State for Business, Innovation and Skills; MP for Bromsgrove (Remain supporter) (endorsed Stephen Crabb, later Theresa May)
Penny Mordaunt, Minister of State for the Armed Forces since 2015; MP for Portsmouth North since 2010 (Leave supporter) (endorsed Andrea Leadsom - Campaign Chair)
David Morris, MP for Morecambe and Lunesdale since 2015 (Remain supporter) (endorsed Stephen Crabb, later Theresa May)
Jesse Norman, Chairman of the Culture, Media and Sport Select Committee since 2015; MP for Hereford and South Herefordshire since 2010 (endorsed Boris Johnson, then Theresa May)
George Osborne, First Secretary of State since 2015; Chancellor of the Exchequer since 2010; MP for Tatton (Remain supporter) (endorsed Theresa May)
Priti Patel, Minister of State for Employment since 2015; MP for Witham (Leave supporter) (endorsed Boris Johnson, then Theresa May)
Owen Paterson, Secretary of State for Environment, Food and Rural Affairs 2012–2014; Secretary of State for Northern Ireland 2010–2012; MP for North Shropshire since 1997 (Leave supporter) (endorsed Andrea Leadsom)
Dominic Raab, Parliamentary Undersecretary of State for Justice since 2015; MP for Esher and Walton (Leave supporter) (endorsed Boris Johnson, later Michael Gove)
Amber Rudd, Secretary of State for Energy and Climate Change since 2015; MP for Hastings and Rye since 2010 (Remain supporter) (endorsed Boris Johnson, then Theresa May)
Anna Soubry, Minister of State for Small Business since 2015; MP for Broxtowe (Remain supporter) (endorsed Theresa May)
Liz Truss, Secretary of State for Environment, Food and Rural Affairs since 2014; MP for South West Norfolk since 2010 (Remain supporter) (endorsed Boris Johnson, then Michael Gove, then Theresa May) 
Theresa Villiers, Secretary of State for Northern Ireland since 2012; Minister of State for Transport 2010–2012; MP for Chipping Barnet since 2005 (Leave Supporter) (endorsed Andrea Leadsom)

Endorsements
N.B. MPs are not required to vote as per their public endorsements.

Stephen Crabb

Liam Fox

Michael Gove

Boris Johnson

Andrea Leadsom

Theresa May

Opinion polling

Polls via polling organisations
Note some polls have asked respondents how they would vote in certain head-to-head scenarios, as indicated below.

See also
2019 Conservative Party leadership election
2017 United Kingdom general election
2016 United Kingdom European Union membership referendum
2016 Labour Party leadership election (UK)

References

2016
David Cameron
Theresa May
Boris Johnson
Conservative
Consequences of the 2016 United Kingdom European Union membership referendum
Conservative Party leadership election
Conservative Party leadership election
Conservative Party leadership election
Conservative Party leadership election